The 1887 Brooklyn Hill football team  was an American football team that represented the Brooklyn Hill Football Club.  Despite not being part of the American Football Union any longer, the Hills were still able to play a competitive schedule and compiled record of at least 0–3 against collegiate and semi-professional opponents.  In their match against the Polytechnic Institute in March, the Hills team and a congregation from the Adelphi Academy combined to play the Polys, but still lost 20 to 4.

Schedule

1887 Brooklyn Heights Football Club schedule

Whether or not the Brooklyn Heights football club was a separate organization from the Brooklyn Hills team is unknown.  There is some evidence though that points to the Heights team as being its own athletic club, and not just another way to describe the hills club, most notably the limited roster differences.  Another solution is that the Brooklyn Heights team was a secondary squad for the more prominent Hills team, although no historical newspapers can substantiate this theory.

References

Brooklyn Hill
Brooklyn Hill football team
Brooklyn Hills football seasons